The Berlin Post Office is located in Berlin, Wisconsin.

It is an Art Moderne-styled post office built in 1936 with help of the PWA, with a mural inside of "Harvesting Cranberries" by Ray Rudell.

References

External links

Post office buildings on the National Register of Historic Places in Wisconsin
National Register of Historic Places in Green Lake County, Wisconsin
Public Works Administration in Wisconsin
Streamline Moderne architecture in Wisconsin
Brick buildings and structures
Government buildings completed in 1937